Ringworld is a 1970 science fiction novel by Larry Niven, set in his Known Space universe and considered a classic of science fiction literature. Ringworld tells the story of Louis Wu and his companions on a mission to the Ringworld, a rotating wheel artificial world, an alien construct in space  in diameter. Niven later added three sequel novels and then cowrote, with Edward M. Lerner, four prequels and a final sequel; the five latter novels constitute the Fleet of Worlds series. All the novels in the Ringworld series tie into numerous other books set in Known Space. Ringworld won the Nebula Award in 1970, as well as both the Hugo Award and Locus Award in 1971.

Plot summary
On planet Earth in 2850 AD, Louis Gridley Wu is celebrating his 200th birthday. Despite his age, Louis is in perfect physical condition due to the longevity drug boosterspice. He meets Nessus, a Pierson's puppeteer, who offers him a mysterious job. Intrigued, Louis eventually accepts. Speaker-to-Animals (Speaker), who is a Kzin, and Teela Brown, a young human woman who becomes Louis's lover, also join the crew.

On the puppeteer home world, they are told that the expedition's goal is to investigate the Ringworld, a gigantic artificial ring, to see if it poses any threat. The Ringworld is about one million miles (1.6 million km) wide and approximately the diameter of Earth's orbit (which makes it about 584.3 million miles or 940.4 million km in circumference), encircling a sunlike star. It rotates to provide artificial gravity 99.2% as strong as Earth's from centrifugal force. The Ringworld has a habitable, flat inner surface (equivalent in area to approximately three million Earths), a breathable atmosphere and a temperature optimal for humans. Night is provided by an inner ring of shadow squares which are connected to each other by thin, ultra-strong wire. When the crew completes their mission, they will be given the starship in which they travelled to the puppeteer home world; it is orders of magnitude faster than any possessed by humans or Kzinti.

When they reach the vicinity of the Ringworld, they are unable to contact anyone, and their ship, the Lying Bastard, is disabled by the Ringworld's automated meteoroid-defense system. The severely damaged vessel collides with a strand of shadow-square wire and crash-lands near a huge mountain, "Fist-of-God". As the fusion drive is destroyed, they are unable to launch back into space where they could use the undamaged faster-than-light hyperdrive to return home. They set out to find a way to get the Lying Bastard off the Ringworld.

Using their flycycles (similar to antigravity motorcycles), they try to reach the rim of the ring, where they hope to find some technology that will help them. It will take them months to cross the vast distance. When Teela develops "Plateau trance" (a kind of highway hypnosis), they are forced to land. On the ground, they encounter apparently primitive human natives who live in the crumbling ruins of a once-advanced city and think that the crew are the engineers who created the ring, and whom they revere as gods. The crew is attacked when they commit what the natives consider blasphemy (the misuse of certain technologies).

They continue their journey, during which Nessus reveals some Puppeteer secrets: they have conducted experiments on both humans (breeding for luck via Birthright Lotteries: all of Teela's ancestors for six generations were born from winning the lottery) and Kzinti (breeding for reduced aggression via the Man-Kzin wars, which the Kzinti always lost). Speaker's outrage forces Nessus to flee and follow them from a safe distance.

In a floating building over the ruins of a city, they find a map of the Ringworld and videos of its past civilization.

While flying through a giant storm caused by air escaping through a hole in the Ring floor due to a meteoroid impact, Teela becomes separated from the others. While Louis and Speaker search for her, their flycycles are caught by an automated police trap designed to catch traffic offenders. They are trapped in the basement of a floating police station. Nessus enters the station to try to help them.

In the station, they meet Halrloprillalar Hotrufan ("Prill"), a former crew member of a trading spaceship that collected plants and animals that couldn't adapt to the Ringworld. When her ship returned to the Ringworld the last time, they found that civilization had collapsed. The crew managed to enter the Ringworld, but some of them were killed and others suffered brain damage when the device that let them pass through the Ringworld floor failed. From her account, they learn that a mold was brought back from one of the original planets of the engineers by a spaceship like Prill's; it broke down the superconductors vital to the Ringworld civilization, dooming it.

Teela reaches the police station, accompanied by her new lover, a native "hero" called Seeker who helped her survive. Based on an insight gained from studying an ancient Ringworld map, Louis comes up with a plan to get home. Teela chooses to remain on the Ringworld with Seeker. Louis, formerly skeptical about breeding for luck, now wonders if the entire mission was caused by Teela's luck, to unite her with her true love and help her mature.

The party collects one end of the shadow-square wire that was snapped when the ship crashed. They travel back to their crashed ship in the floating police station, dragging the wire behind them. Louis threads it through the ship to tether it to the police station. He then takes the police station up to the summit of "Fist-of-God", the enormous mountain near their crash site. The mountain had not appeared on the Ringworld map, leading Louis to conclude that it is in fact the result of a meteoroid impact with the underside of the ring, which pushed the "mountain" up from the ring's floor and broke through. The top of the mountain, above the atmosphere, is therefore just a hole in the Ringworld floor. Louis drives the police station over the edge, dragging the Lying Bastard along with it. The Ringworld spins very quickly, so once the ship drops through the hole and clears the ring, they can use the ship's hyperdrive to get home. The book concludes with Louis and Speaker discussing returning to the Ringworld.

Reception

Algis Budrys found Ringworld to be "excellent and entertaining ... woven together very skillfully and proceed[ing] at a pretty smooth pace." While praising the novel generally, he faulted Niven for relying on inconsistencies regarding evolution in his extrapolations to support his fictional premises.

Sam Jordison described Ringworld as "arguably one of the most influential science fiction novels of the past 50 years.

Concepts reused
In addition to the two aliens, Niven includes a number of concepts from his other Known Space stories:

 The puppeteers' General Products hulls, which are impervious to any known force except visible light and gravity, and for a long time thought indestructible by anything except antimatter. The Fleet of Worlds prequels reveal two other ways that the hulls can be destroyed. 
 The Slaver stasis field, which causes time in the enclosed volume to stand still; since time has for all intents and purposes ceased for an object in stasis, no harm can come to anything within the field.
 The idea that luck is a genetic trait that can be strengthened by selective breeding.
 The tasp, a device that remotely stimulates the pleasure center of the brain; it temporarily incapacitates its target and is extremely psychologically addictive. If the subject cannot, for whatever reason, get access to the device, intense depression can result, often to the point of madness or suicide. To use a tasp on someone from hiding, relieving them of their anger or depression, is called "making their day".
 Boosterspice, a drug that restores or indefinitely preserves youth.
 Scrith, the metal-like substance of which the Ringworld is built (and presumably the shadow squares and wires too), that has a tensile strength nearly equal in magnitude to the strong nuclear force making it similar to the concept of nuclear matter. This makes it an example of unobtainium. This is similar to the Pak Protector's "twing" used in other Larry Niven stories.
 Impact armor, a flexible form of clothing that hardens instantly into a rigid form stronger than steel when rapidly deformed, similar to certain types of bulletproof vests.
 The hyperspace shunt, an engine for faster-than-light travel, but slow enough (1 light-year per 3 days, ~122 c) to keep the galaxy vast and unknown; the new "quantum II hyperspace shunt", developed by the Puppeteers but not yet released to humans, can cross a light-year in just 1.25 minutes (~421 000 c).
 Point-to-point teleportation at the speed of light is possible with transfer booths (on Earth) and stepping disks (on the Puppeteer homeworld); on Earth, people's sense of place and global position has been lost due to instantaneous travel; cities and cultures have blended together.
 A theme well covered in the novel is that of cultures suffering technological breakdowns who then proceed to revert to belief systems along religious lines. Most Ringworld societies have forgotten that they live on an artificial structure, and now attribute the phenomena and origin of their world to divine power.

Errors

The opening chapter of the original paperback edition of Ringworld featured Louis Wu teleporting eastward around the Earth in order to extend his birthday. Moving in this direction would, in fact, make local time later rather than earlier, so that Wu would soon arrive in the early morning of the next calendar day. Niven was "endlessly teased" about this error, which he corrected in subsequent printings to show Wu teleporting westward. In his dedication to The Ringworld Engineers, Niven wrote, "If you own a first paperback edition of Ringworld, it's the one with the mistakes in it. It's worth money."

After the publication of Ringworld, many fans identified numerous engineering problems in the Ringworld as described in the novel. One major one was that the Ringworld, being a rigid structure, was not actually in orbit around the star it encircled and would eventually drift, ultimately colliding with its sun and disintegrating. This led MIT students attending the 1971 Worldcon to chant, "The Ringworld is unstable!" Niven wrote the 1980 sequel The Ringworld Engineers in part to address these engineering issues. In it, the ring is found to have a system of attitude jets atop the rim walls, but the Ringworld has become gravely endangered because most of the jets have been removed by the natives, to power their interstellar ships. (The natives had forgotten the original purpose of the jets.)

The fifth chapter refers to Nereid as Neptune's largest moon; the planet's largest moon is Triton.

Influence
"Ringworld", has become a generic term for such a structure, which is an example of what science fiction fans call a "Big Dumb Object", or more formally a megastructure. Other science fiction authors have devised their own variants of Niven's Ringworld, notably Iain M. Banks' Culture Orbitals, best described as miniature Ringworlds, and the titular ring-shaped Halo structures of the video game series Halo. Such a mini-Ringworld appears in Star Wars: The Book of Boba Fett, Season 1, Episode 5.

Adaptations

Games
In 1984, a role-playing game based on this setting was produced by Chaosium named The Ringworld Roleplaying Game. Information from the RPG, along with notes composed by RPG author John Hewitt with Niven, was later used to form the "Bible" given to authors writing in the Man-Kzin Wars series. Niven himself recommended that Hewitt write one of the stories for the original two MKW books, although this never came to pass.

Tsunami Games released two adventure games based on Ringworld. Ringworld: Revenge of the Patriarch was released in 1992 and Return to Ringworld in 1994. A third game, Ringworld: Within ARM's Reach, was also planned, but never completed.

The video game franchise Halo, created by Bungie and now handled by 343 Industries, took inspiration from the book in the creation and development of its story around the eponymous rings, called Halos. These are physically similar to the Ringworld, however they are much smaller and do not encircle the star, instead orbiting stars or planets.

The open source video game Endless Sky features an alien species that creates ringworlds.

In 2017 Paradox Interactive added a DLC called "Utopia" to their game Stellaris, allowing the player to restore or build ringworlds.

In 2021 Mobius Digital added a DLC called "Echoes of the Eye" to their game Outer Wilds, which allows the player to explore a hidden, abandoned ringworld and determine what happened to its inhabitants.

On screen
There have been many aborted attempts to adapt the novel to the screen.

In 2001, Larry Niven reported that a movie deal had been signed and was in the early planning stages.

In 2004, the Sci-Fi Channel reported that it was developing a Ringworld miniseries. The series never came to fruition.

In 2013, it was again announced by the channel, now rebranded as Syfy, that a miniseries of the novel was in development. This proposed 4-hour miniseries was being written by Michael R. Perry and would have been a co-production between MGM Television and Universal Cable Productions.

In 2017, Amazon announced that Ringworld was one of three science fiction series it was developing for its streaming service. MGM were again listed as a co-producer.

OEL manga
Tor/Seven Seas (same joint venture of Macmillan's Tor Books and Seven Seas Entertainment who also published the English-language translation of Afro Samurai) published a two-part original English-language manga adaptation of Ringworld, with the script written by Robert Mandell and the artwork by Sean Lam. Ringworld: The Graphic Novel, Part One, covering the events of the novel up to the sunflower attack on Speaker, was released on July 8, 2014. Part Two was released on November 10, 2015.

In other works

 Terry Pratchett intended his 1981 novel Strata to be a "piss-take/homage/satire" of Ringworld. Niven took it in good humor and enjoyed the work.
 The plot of the first-person shooter Halo: Combat Evolved for the Xbox, Windows, and Mac OS X also takes place on an artificial ring structure. Similarities to Ringworld have been noted in the game, and Niven was asked (but declined) to write the first novel based on the series.
 "All in Fun" by Jerry Oltion, in Fantasy & Science Fiction, January 2009, mentions a faithful big-budget movie adaptation of Ringworld.
 In Ernest Cline's 2011 novel Ready Player One, one of the sectors of the OASIS, the worldwide virtual reality network that is the novel's primary setting, is mentioned as being an adaptation of Ringworld.
 The 1987 novel The Alexandrian Ring by William R. Forstchen takes place on a ring much like Niven's.
 Episode 5 of The Book of Boba Fett features a station called Glavis that is shaped like a ring and features sun shades in much the same way that Niven's does.

Books in series

 Fleet of Worlds (2007)
 Juggler of Worlds (2008)
 Destroyer of Worlds (2009)
 Betrayer of Worlds (2010)

 Ringworld (1970)
 The Ringworld Engineers (1980)
 The Ringworld Throne (1996)
 Ringworld's Children (2004)

 Fate of Worlds: Return from the Ringworld (2012)

See also

 Bishop Ring (habitat)
 Dyson sphere
 Megastructure
 Orbital (The Culture)
 Orbital ring
 Stanford torus

References

External links
 The Incompleat Known Space Concordance— Appendix: The Ringworld
 Encyclopedia of Known Space: Ringworld
 Physical parameters of the Ringworld
 Ringworld at Worlds Without End
 The Physics of Ringworld (official site)
 Aspects of Ringworld
 Ringworlds
 

1970 American novels
1970 science fiction novels
American science fiction novels
Ballantine Books books
English-language novels
Fiction set in the 29th century
Hard science fiction
Hugo Award for Best Novel-winning works
Novels about impact events
Known Space stories
Exploratory engineering
Terraforming
Nebula Award for Best Novel-winning works
Novels by Larry Niven
Space colonization
Teleportation in fiction
Fiction about astronomical objects
Fiction about megastructures
Xenoarchaeology in fiction

tr:Halka Dünya